The Floridian peninsula is a porous plateau of karst limestone sitting atop bedrock known as the Florida Platform. The emergent portion of the platform was created during the Eocene to Oligocene as the Gulf Trough filled with silts, clays, and sands. Flora and fauna began appearing during the Miocene. No land animals were present in Florida prior to the Miocene.

Limestone over bedrock

The Floridian peninsula is a porous plateau of karst limestone sitting atop bedrock known as the Florida Platform. The emergent portion of the platform was created during the Eocene to Oligocene as the Gulf Trough filled with silts, clays, and sands. Flora and fauna began appearing during the Miocene. No land animals were present in Florida prior to the Miocene.

The largest deposits of rock phosphate in the United States are found in Florida. Most of this is in Bone Valley in central and west-central Florida.

Extended systems of underwater caves, sinkholes and springs are found throughout the state and supply most of the water used by residents. This type of terrain (geomorphology) that develops over a carbonate platform or strata is called Karst Topography.

The limestone is topped with sandy soils deposited as ancient beaches over millions of years as global sea levels rose and fell. During the last glacial period, lower sea levels and a drier climate revealed a much wider peninsula, largely savanna. While there are sinkholes in much of the state, modern sinkholes most commonly form in the Tampa Bay area and Central Florida.

Early history of Florida

During the early Mesozoic Era (251 – 66 mya) the supercontinent of Pangea began to rift and break apart.  As North America separated from Africa a small portion of the African plate detached and was carried away with the North American plate. This provided some of the foundation upon which Florida now rests.

The emergent portion of the platform was created during the Eocene to Oligocene as the Gulf Trough filled with silts, clays, and sands. Flora and fauna began appearing during the Miocene..

Earthquakes
Florida is tied with North Dakota as having the fewest earthquakes of any US state. Because Florida is not located near any tectonic plate boundaries, earthquakes are very rare, but not totally unknown. In January 1879, a shock occurred near St. Augustine. There were reports of heavy shaking that knocked plaster from walls and articles from shelves. The tremor was felt as far south as Tampa and as far north as Savannah, Georgia. In January 1880, Cuba was the center of two strong earthquakes that sent severe shock waves through the city of Key West, Florida. Another earthquake centered outside Florida was the 1886 Charleston earthquake. The shock was felt throughout northern Florida, ringing church bells at St. Augustine and severely jolting other towns along that section of Florida's east coast. Jacksonville residents felt many of the strong aftershocks that occurred in September, October, and November 1886. The earthquake was too small to trigger a tsunami and no damage was reported. Minor shaking was felt in Southwest Florida. Some taller buildings in the city of Cape Coral reported swaying. On January 28, 2020, a 7.7 magnitude earthquake between Cuba and Jamaica was felt in Southeast Florida, causing many office and residential buildings in Miami to be evacuated.

References

 
Florida
Natural history of Florida